Mr. Bad Example is an album by the American musician Warren Zevon, released through Giant Records in October 1991. Zevon supported the album with a North American tour, with the Odds serving as both opener and backing band.

Production
Mr. Bad Example was produced by Waddy Wachtel. Los Angeles session musicians contributed to the album. Zevon sometimes struggled for songwriting ideas, but always finished a song once he had started.

Dwight Yoakam provided backing vocals on "Heartache Spoken Here"; Dan Dugmore played pedal steel. David Lindley played a variety of instruments on "Quite Ugly One Morning". "Searching for a Heart" appeared on the soundtrack to the film Love at Large.

Critical reception

The Boston Globe called Mr. Bad Example "a wonderful, resonant album, eclectic and accessible." The Chicago Tribune deemed it "a return to the terse guitar-drums-keyboard format of [Zevon's] '70s albums." The Sun Sentinel considered it to be "pure, earthy rock accessibly colored by Zevon's typically wry imagery."

The Calgary Herald wrote that "Zevon's become a somewhat torpid renegade wailing away about his rebellion while safely ensconced in L.A. security." The Austin American-Statesman determined that "Zevon's first-person characters on this record are shocking, reprehensible and relentlessly slapstick."

Track listing
All tracks composed by Warren Zevon, except where indicated.

Personnel
Warren Zevon – guitar, keyboards, vocals
Jorge Calderón – bass guitar on "Mr. Bad Example", "Quite Ugly One Morning" and "Things to Do in Denver When You're Dead", harmony vocals
Dan Dugmore – guitar on "Model Citizen", pedal steel on "Heartache Spoken Here"
Bob Glaub – bass guitar
Jim Keltner – drums on "Mr. Bad Example" and "Things to Do in Denver When You're Dead"
Tito Larriva – harmony vocals on "Angel Dressed in Black"
Kipp Lennon – harmony vocals on "Searching for a Heart"
Mark Lennon – harmony vocals on "Searching for a Heart"
Michael Lennon – harmony vocals on "Searching for a Heart"
David Lindley – fiddle on "Renegade", saz, lap steel guitar, cümbüş on "Quite Ugly One Morning"
Jeff Porcaro – drums
Waddy Wachtel – guitar, harmony vocals
Dwight Yoakam – harmony vocals on "Heartache Spoken Here"
Jordan Zevon – harmony vocals

Production
Producer: Waddy Wachtel
Engineer: Marc DeSisto
Assistant engineers: Andrew Ballard, Scott Blockland, Jeffrey Shannon, Brian Soucy
Mixing: Niko Bolas, John Beverly Jones
Dave Collins – Mastering
Technical assistance: Peggy McAfee, Tom Smyth
Art Direction and design: Jeri Heiden
Photography: Diego Uchitel, Jimmy Wachtel

References 

Warren Zevon albums
1991 albums
Giant Records (Warner) albums
Albums produced by Waddy Wachtel